Kapoor is a surname that originated with the Punjabi Khatri community.

Kapoor may also refer to:

People
 John Kapoor (born 1942/1943), American pharmaceutical entrepreneur
 Kapoor family, a Hindi-language acting family of India
 Venkat Kapoor, a character from Andy Weir's 2011 science fiction survival novel The Martian
 Vincent Kapoor, the name of the character in the 2015 film based on the novel

Places
 Kapoor Haveli (Kapoor House), Peshawar, Pakistan
 Kapoor Tunnel, an aqueduct for Victoria, British Columbia, Canada
 Kapoorgarh (Kapoor-village), Punjab, India

See also 

 Kapoor & Sons (2016 film), Indian Hindi-language family drama film
 
 
 Kapooria, a fungus genus discovered
 Kapur (disambiguation)
 Kapurpur (disambiguation)